Olga Gennadyevna Golovkina (Ольга Геннадьевна Головкина; born 17 December 1986 in Perm) is a Russian athlete. She won the gold medal in the 5000 m at the 2012 European Athletics Championships in Helsinki in a time of 15:11.70 minutes.

Golovkina finished second in the 5000m at the 2013 Summer Universiade in Kazan behind Roxana Bârcă of Romania. She was subsequently upgraded to first place after Bârcă failed the post-race doping control, even though Golovkina herself then tested positive in an out-of-competition drugs test just five days after the race, for use of the prohibited anabolic steroid Dehydrochloromethyltestosterone. Golovkina was given a two-year ban from competition for her failed test, lasting from 16 July 2013 to 1 August 2015.

International competitions

See also
List of doping cases in athletics
List of European Athletics Championships medalists (women)
List of people from Perm

References

External links

1986 births
Living people
Sportspeople from Perm, Russia
Russian female long-distance runners
Olympic athletes of Russia
Athletes (track and field) at the 2012 Summer Olympics
Universiade gold medalists in athletics (track and field)
Universiade gold medalists for Russia
Medalists at the 2013 Summer Universiade
European Athletics Championships winners
European Athletics Championships medalists
Russian Athletics Championships winners
Doping cases in athletics
Russian sportspeople in doping cases